The Netherlands has a single nationwide bike sharing program, called OV-fiets, which means 'public transport bike'. The system has 20,500 bikes in 300 locations, mainly train stations, all over the country. Membership is required (annual fee €0.01, €4.15 per rental day) and can be combined with an OV-chipkaart. The program, which started on a small scale in 2003, has enjoyed a steadily increasing popularity with over 4 million rides registered in 2018. The nature of the Dutch bike sharing program differs from that of programs in other countries partly because the already high bike ownership of the population. Its interconnection with the public transport network allows it to fill the need of people who also want to continue traveling by bike from the station of their destination.

Statistics

Photo gallery

References

External links
 Official website of OV-fiets

Community bicycle programs
Bicycle sharing in the Netherlands